Asnois is a commune in the Vienne department in the Nouvelle-Aquitaine region in western France.

See also
Communes of the Vienne department

References

External links

 Moulin de Roussille à Asnois

Communes of Vienne